Bragança may refer to:

People
Jaime Celestino Dias Bragança, a Portuguese footballer

Politics and History
House of Bragança - A Portuguese Royal House
Duke of Bragança - A Portuguese noble, and later royal, title

Places

Brazil
 Bragança, Pará, a municipality in the State of Pará
 Bragança Paulista, São Paulo, a municipality in the State of São Paulo

Portugal
 Bragança, Portugal, a city and municipality in the north-eastern district of Bragança
 Bragança District, a historical district in the Norte region of Portugal

Sports
 G.D. Bragança, association football club based in Bragança Municipality

See also
 Braganza (disambiguation)